The 1944 Howard Bulldogs football team was an American football team that represented Howard College (now known as the Samford University) as an independent during the 1944 college football season. In their first year under head coach Bub Walker, the team compiled an 0–5 record.

Schedule

References

Howard
Samford Bulldogs football seasons
College football winless seasons
Howard Bulldogs football